Nice–Alassio was a professional one-day road cycling race that was held from 1979 until 1997. It was known as Monte Carlo–Alassio from 1993 to 1996 and the Alassio Cup in 1997.

The race was held in February as a preparation race for Milan–San Remo.

Winners

References

Cycle races in Italy
Cycle races in France
Recurring sporting events established in 1979
Recurring sporting events disestablished in 1997
1979 establishments in France
1997 disestablishments in France
1979 establishments in Italy
1997 disestablishments in Italy
Defunct cycling races in France
Defunct cycling races in Italy